Faverolles may refer to several communes in France:

Faverolles, Aisne, in the Aisne département
Faverolles, Cantal, in the Cantal département 
Faverolles, Eure-et-Loir, in the Eure-et-Loir département 
Faverolles, Indre, in the Indre département
Faverolles, Haute-Marne, in the Haute-Marne département 
Faverolles, Orne, in the Orne département
Faverolles, Somme, in the Somme département
Faverolles-et-Coëmy, in the Marne département 
Faverolles-la-Campagne, in the Eure département 
Faverolles-lès-Lucey, in the Côte-d'Or département
Faverolles-sur-Cher, in the Loir-et-Cher département
Faverolles-les-Mares, a former commune that is now Bournainville-Faverolles in the Eure département 
 Faverolles (chicken), a breed of chicken